Horse Stories is the third major album by Australian rock band Dirty Three, released in September 1996 by Touch and Go Records. The album was recorded at Maison Rouge Studios, London, while the cover art was designed by guitarist Mick Turner.

"I Remember a Time When Once You Used to Love Me" is a cover of the Greek song Mia phora thymamai, written by Giannis Spanos and originally sung by the singer-songwriter Arleta.

Track listing
All songs written by Dirty Three, except where noted.

 "1000 Miles" – 4:40
 "Sue's Last Ride" – 7:22
 "Hope" – 4:53
 "I Remember a Time When Once You Used to Love Me" (Yiannis Spanos) – 6:11
 "At the Bar" – 6:39
 "Red" – 3:54
 "Warren's Lament" – 8:44
 "Horse" – 5:38
 "I Knew It Would Come to This" – 8:38

Notes

1996 albums
Dirty Three albums
Touch and Go Records albums